The First Van Agt cabinet, also called the Van Agt–Wiegel cabinet was the executive branch of the Dutch Government from 19 December 1977 until 11 September 1981. The cabinet was formed by the christian-democratic Christian Democratic Appeal (CDA) and the conservative-liberal People's Party for Freedom and Democracy (VVD) after the election of 1977. The cabinet was a centre-right coalition and had a slim majority in the House of Representatives with Christian Democratic Leader Dries van Agt serving as Prime Minister. Liberal Leader Hans Wiegel served as Deputy Prime Minister and Minister of the Interior.

The cabinet served in the final years of the radical 1970s and the early years of the economic expansion of the 1980s. Domestically it had to deal with the last days of the counterculture, the abdication of Queen Juliana and the installation of Queen Beatrix, a growing inflation following the recession in the 1980s but it was able to implement several major social reforms to the public sector and civil reforms and stimulating deregulation and privatization. Internationally it had to deal with the 1979 oil crisis and the fallout of the increasing international stand against Apartheid in South Africa. The cabinet suffered several major internal and external conflicts including multiple cabinet resignations, including a informal caucus of several Christian Democrats in the House of Representatives that only supported the cabinet in a confidence and supply construction, but it was able to complete its entire term and was succeeded by the Second Van Agt cabinet following the election of 1981.

Formation
After the 1977 general election the Labour Party (PvdA) of incumbent Prime Minister Joop den Uyl was the winner of the election which won ten new seats and had now a total of 53 seats. The People's Party for Freedom and Democracy (VVD) of Hans Wiegel won six seats and had now 28 seats. The Anti-Revolutionary Party (ARP), Catholic People's Party (KVP) and the Christian Historical Union (CHU) participated for the first time as the combined party Christian Democratic Appeal (CDA) with Dries van Agt as its new Leader. This electoral fusion resulted in one new seat and now had a total of 49 seats in the House of Representatives. A long negotiation between the Labour Party and Christian Democratic Appeal followed. Both parties had come out of the elections as equal partners. The negotiations were troubled by the personal animosity between incumbent Prime Minister and Leader of the Labour Party Joop den Uyl and the Leader of the Christian Democratic Appeal Dries van Agt. Van Agt who served as Deputy Prime Minister under Den Uyl his cabinet had a bad working relationship. In the end Van Agt found that the demands of the Den Uyl were too great and instead he formed a coalition with the People's Party for Freedom and Democracy.

Term
The cabinet had to deal with a major economic depression, but refused to cut government spending due to fierce left-wing opposition in the parliament, which had nearly half of the seats. Many left-wing demonstrations were held on the street against the government. Notorious were the harsh demonstrations in Amsterdam during the crowning of Queen Beatrix and the squatting riots. There was a sharp increase in unemployment and the government was seen to have created too much debt.

Changes
On 5 March 1978 Minister of Defence Roelof Kruisinga (CHU) resigned in-protest after the cabinet decided to not publicly condemn the United States for further developing the Neutron bomb. Minister for Development Cooperation Jan de Koning (ARP) served as acting Minister of Defence until 8 March 1978 when Member of the Council of State Willem Scholten (CHU) was appointed as his successor.

On 1 April 1979 Minister for Science Policy Rinus Peijnenburg (KVP) unexpectedly died from a heart attack at the age of 51. Minister of Health and Environment Leendert Ginjaar (VVD) served as acting Minister for Science Policy until 3 May 1979 when Ton van Trier, who until then had been working as a professor of electrical engineering at the Eindhoven University of Technology was installed as his successor. Ton van Trier an Independent Christian Democrat joined the Catholic People's Party that same month.

On 22 February 1980 Minister of Finance Frans Andriessen (KVP) resigned after disagreeing with the cabinets decision to not implement a stronger austerity policy. State Secretary for Finance Ad Nooteboom (CHU) declares his solidarity with Frans Andriessen and also resigned that same day.
Minister of Economic Affairs Gijs van Aardenne (VVD) served as acting Minister of Finance until 5 March 1980 when Minister of Agriculture and Fisheries Fons van der Stee (KVP) was appointed as Minister of Finance. That same day Member of the House of Representatives Gerrit Braks (KVP) was installed as Minister of Agriculture and Fisheries. On 16 April 1980 Member of the House of Representatives Marius van Amelsvoort (KVP) was appointed as State Secretary for Finance.

On 25 August 1980 Minister of Defence Willem Scholten (CHU) resigned after he was appointed Vice-President of the Council of State. That same day former naval officer Pieter de Geus (CHU), who until then had been working as a top official at the Ministry of Defence was appointed as his successor.

On 1 September 1981 ten days before the new cabinet took office Minister for Housing and Spatial Planning Pieter Beelaerts van Blokland (CDA) resigned after he had been appointed Mayor of Apeldoorn. Minister of Transport and Water Management Dany Tuijnman (VVD) took over the position until the new cabinet was installed on 11 September 1981.

Cabinet Members

Trivia
 Eleven cabinet members had previous experience as scholars or professors: Dries van Agt (Criminal Law and Procedure), Chris van der Klaauw (International Relations), Job de Ruiter (Civil Law), Roelof Kruisinga (Otorhinolaryngology), Leendert Ginjaar (Chemistry), Wil Albeda (Social Economics and Labour Law), Arie Pais (Public Economics), Dany Tuijnman (Agronomy), Ton van Trier (Electrical Engineering), Ad Nooteboom (Fiscal Law) and Wim van Eekelen (Political Science).
 Five cabinet members (later) served as Mayors: Gerrit Braks (Eindhoven), Pieter Beelaerts van Blokland (Wolphaartsdijk, Vianen, Amstelveen, Apeldoorn and Hengelo), Bert Haars (Kockengen), Gerrit Brokx (Tilburg) and Jeltien Kraaijeveld-Wouters (Hilversum).
 Four cabinet members (later) served as Party Leaders and Lijsttrekkers: Dries van Agt (1976–1982) of the Christian Democratic Appeal, Hans Wiegel (1971–1982) of the People's Party for Freedom and Democracy, Frans Andriessen (1971–1977) of the Catholic People's Party and Roelof Kruisinga (1973–1977) of the Christian Historical Union.
 Four cabinet members (later) served as Queen's Commissioners: Dries van Agt (North Brabant), Hans Wiegel (Friesland) and Pieter Beelaerts van Blokland (Utrecht).
 Three cabinet members (later) served as on the Council of State: Jan de Koning (1990–1994), Willem Scholten (1976–1978, 1980–1997) and Til Gardeniers-Berendsen (1983–1995).
 Two cabinet members would later serve as European Commissioners: Frans Andriessen (1981–1993) and Neelie Kroes (2004–2014).

References

External links
Official

  Kabinet-Van Agt I Parlement & Politiek
  Kabinet-Van Agt I Rijksoverheid

Cabinets of the Netherlands
1977 establishments in the Netherlands
1981 disestablishments in the Netherlands
Cabinets established in 1977
Cabinets disestablished in 1981